Parochromolopis psittacanthus is a moth in the family Epermeniidae. It was described by John B. Heppner in 1980. It is found in Costa Rica.

The larvae feed on Psittacanthus calyculatus. They bore in the fruits of their host plant.

References

Moths described in 1980
Epermeniidae
Moths of Central America